Chenonetta is a genus of dabbling duck. One species is extinct, while the other is extant.

Species
The genus includes the following two species:

Australian wood duck (Chenonetta jubata) 
Finsch's duck (Chenonetta finschi) — extinct, 1870

References

 
Bird genera
Bird genera with one living species